Africa for Africa is an album by Nigerian musician Femi Kuti, released in 2010 on Wrasse Records. The album was also released in 2011 on Knitting Factory Records.

Track listing
Dem Bobo
Nobody Beg You
Politics in Africa
Bad Government
Can't Buy Me
Africa for Africa
Make We Remember
Obasanjo Don Play You Wayo
Boys Dey Hungry for Town
Now You See
No Blame Them
Yeparipa
E No Good
It Don't Mean

Personnel
 Seye Adewunmi – trumpet
 Oluwaseun Ajayi – keyboards
 Bose Ajila – vocals (Background)
 Akin Akinboro – percussion
 Olusola Alobalorun – trumpet
 Morufu Anifowoshe – engineer
 Femi Anikulapo-Kuti – composer, organ, saxophone, trumpet, vocals
 Opeyemi Awomolo – guitar, leader
 Daniel Bankole – baritone sax
 Dotun Bankole – tenor sax
 Anthonia Bernards – background vocals
 Tom Darnal – artwork
 Onome Kate-Udi – background vocals
 Jubril Ogungbade – engineer
 Tiwalade Ogunlowo – trombone
 Adebowale Oloko-Obi – drums
 Adekunle Osunniran – percussion, sekere
 Jolaosho Sunday – engineer
 Marc Welter – mixing assistant
 Sodi – production

References

2010 albums
Femi Kuti albums
Wrasse Records albums
Knitting Factory Records albums
Afrobeat albums
Yoruba-language albums